Lamar School District is a public school district based in Lamar, Arkansas, United States. The school district supports more than 1,566 students in prekindergarten through grade 12 in the 2015-16 school year by employing more than 170 faculty and staff on a full time equivalent basis for its three schools.

The school district encompasses  of land in Johnson County and Pope County and serves all or portions of Lamar, London, Clarksville, Ozone, Knoxville, and Hagarville.

Schools 
Interscholastic activities at the junior varsity and varsity level are played at the 3A Classification level within the 3A 4 Conference as administered by the Arkansas Activities Association. The mascot for the schools is the Warrior.

 Lamar High School, serving more than 500 students in grades 8 through 12.
 Lamar Middle School, serving more than 400 students in grades 4 through 7.
 Lamar Elementary School, serving more than 500 students in prekindergarten through grade 3.

References

External links
 

Education in Johnson County, Arkansas
Education in Perry County, Arkansas
School districts in Arkansas